Solanum incanum is a species of nightshade, a flowering plant in the family Solanaceae. It is native to Sub-Saharan Africa and the Middle East, eastwards to India. The species was introduced to Taiwan and Vietnam.

Common names include thorn apple, bitter apple, bitterball  and bitter tomato  It may be confused with the similar S. linnaeanum where their ranges overlap in Africa.  In ancient India, Solanum incanum was domesticated into the eggplant, Solanum melongena. In biblical literature, it is sometimes used as a "hedge of thorns".

Gallery

References

External links

 
Solanum incanum L., Prota database

incanum
Desert fruits
Flora of Western Asia
Flora of Chad
Flora of Egypt
Flora of Ethiopia
Flora of Iran
Flora of Mali
Flora of Somalia
Flora of Syria
Flora of Sudan
Plants described in 1753
Taxa named by Carl Linnaeus